Germantown is an unincorporated community in Henry County, in the U.S. state of Missouri.

Germantown was laid out in 1857, and named for the fact a large share of the first settlers were German Catholics.

St. Ludger Catholic Church, which is listed on the National Register of Historic Places, is located in Germantown.

References

Unincorporated communities in Henry County, Missouri
1857 establishments in Missouri
Unincorporated communities in Missouri